Cretatriacanthus is an extinct genus of prehistoric ray-finned fish. It contains a single species, C. guidotti.

See also

 Prehistoric fish
 List of prehistoric bony fish

References

Prehistoric ray-finned fish genera
Tetraodontiformes
Fossil taxa described in 1996